Turkey Point may refer to:
Turkey Point, Ontario, a Canadian village
Turkey Point Nuclear Generating Station, a nuclear power station in Florida
Turkey Point Park, a park located in the eastern suburbs of Baltimore, Maryland
Turkey Point Light, a lighthouse in Maryland